The 1996 Liga Indonesia Premier Division Final was a football match which was played on 6 October 1996 at Gelora Senayan Main Stadium in Jakarta. It was contested by PSM Makassar and Bandung Raya to determine the winner of the 1995–96 Liga Indonesia Premier Division. Bandung Raya won the match 2–0 to claim their first-ever title.

Road to the final

Match details

See also 
1995–96 Liga Indonesia Premier Division

References

External links
Liga Indonesia Premier Division standings

1996